Hearts of Youth is a lost 1921 American silent film based on the novel Ishmael by E. D. E. N. Southworth. The film was directed by Tom Miranda and Millard Webb, with Webb writing the adaption for the screen. The movie stars Harold Goodwin, Colin Kenny, and Iris Ashton, and was released by the Fox Film Corporation

Plot 
Ishmael Worth renounces his young sweetheart, Beatrice, because he believes himself to be illegitimate and does not want to bring shame to her. Later it is revealed that his mother and father  had  married. His father's previous wife, thought to be dead, turns up to confront him; but the fact that the first wife was a bigamist makes her marriage to Ishmael's father null and void and the marriage between his mother and father therefore valid. Ishmael, having a legitimate father, now can give Beatrice an honest name.

Cast 
 Iris Ashton as Mrs. Grey
 Glen Cavender as Reuben Grey
 George Fisher as Herman Brudenell
 Grace Goodall as Countess Hurstmonceaus
 Harold Goodwin as Ishmael Worth
 Lillian Hall as Beatrice Merlin
 Colin Kenny as Lord Vincent
 Fred Kirby as Judge Merlin

References

External links 

American silent feature films
1921 films
1921 drama films
American black-and-white films
Silent American drama films
Fox Film films
Lost American films
1921 lost films
Lost drama films
Films directed by Millard Webb
1920s American films